Depression, in an anatomical term of motion for movement in an inferior direction. It is the opposite of elevation.

Muscles

Shoulders
 Latissimus dorsi muscle
 Pectoralis minor muscle
 Trapezius muscle
 Serratus anterior muscle
 clavicle
 Subclavius muscle

Mouth
 hyoid / larynx
 Infrahyoid muscles
 sternothyroid 
 sternohyoid
 thyrohyoid 
 omohyoid
 mandible
 Lateral pterygoid muscle
 lower lip
 Depressor labii inferioris muscle
 angle of mouth
 Depressor anguli oris muscle
 nasal septum
 Depressor septi nasi muscle

Eyes
 eyeball
 Inferior rectus muscle
 Superior oblique muscle

Other
 eyebrow
 Depressor supercilii muscle
 diaphragm

Anatomical terms of motion